Esbu Kola (also Romanized as Esbū Kolā; also known as Esmū Kolā) is a village in Lafur Rural District, North Savadkuh County, Mazandaran Province, Iran. At the 2006 census, its population was 43, in 20 families.

References 

Populated places in Savadkuh County